Route 977 is an east-west regional highway in the Golan Heights in northern Israel from Goma junction to Lehavot HaBashan junction.

Junctions on the route

From west to east:

Goma junction with Highway 90 near Ein Bedolah Nature Reserve.
Junction with Route 9778 turning north toward Kfar Blum.
Entrance to Neot Mordechai.
Lehavot HaBashan junction next to Lehavot HaBashan, with Route 918.

See also
List of highways in Israel

977